Manuela Vanegas Cataño (born 9 November 2000) is a Colombian professional footballer who plays as a left back for Spanish Primera División club Real Sociedad and the Colombia women's national team.

International career
Vanegas made her senior debut for Colombia during the 2018 Copa América Femenina.

International goals
Scores and results list Colombia's goal tally first

References

2000 births
Living people
Women's association football fullbacks
Colombian women's footballers
Colombia women's international footballers
Pan American Games gold medalists for Colombia
Pan American Games medalists in football
Footballers at the 2019 Pan American Games
Primera División (women) players
RCD Espanyol Femenino players
Colombian expatriate women's footballers
Colombian expatriate sportspeople in Spain
Expatriate women's footballers in Spain
Medalists at the 2019 Pan American Games
Real Sociedad (women) players
Sportspeople from Antioquia Department
21st-century Colombian women